The Siamese writhing skink or even-toed supple skink (Lygosoma isodactylum) is a species of skink found in Cambodia and Thailand.

References

Lygosoma
Reptiles described in 1864
Taxa named by Albert Günther